Pipecolic acid (piperidine-2-carboxylic acid) is an organic compound with the formula HNC5H9CO2H. It is a carboxylic acid derivative of piperidine and, as such, an amino acid, although not one encoded genetically. Like many other α-amino acids, pipecolic acid is chiral, although the S-stereoisomer is more common. It is a colorless solid. 

Its biosynthesis starts from lysine. CRYM, a taxon-specific  protein that also binds thyroid hormones, is involved in the pipecolic acid pathway.

Medicine
It accumulates in pipecolic acidemia. Pipecolic acid can be associated with some forms of epilepsy.

Occurrence and reactions
Like most amino acids, pipecolic acid is a chelating agent.  One complex is Cu(HNC5H9CO2)2(H2O)2.

Pipecolic acid was identified in the Murchison meteorite.
It also occurs in the leaves of the genus Myroxylon, a tree from South America.

See also
 Bupivacaine
 Efrapeptin

References

2-Piperidinyl compounds
Carboxylic acids
Secondary amino acids